Joshua Young (September 23, 1823 – February 7, 1904) was an abolitionist Congregational Unitarian minister who crossed paths with many famous people of the mid-19th century. He received national publicity, and lost his pulpit (job) for presiding in 1859 over the funeral of John Brown, both the most famous person in the country and the first person executed for treason in the history of the United States. Contrary to his friends' expectations, his resignation under pressure in Burlington did not ruin his career; the church in Burlington later apologized and invited him back to speak, "an honored guest", There is a memorial tablet in the church.

Life and career
Young was born in 1823 in Randolph, near Pittston, Maine, the youngest of eleven children of Aaron Young (1783–1875) and Mary Colburn Young [1780–1866). At about age 4 the family moved to Bangor, where he attended local schools. At the age of 16 he entered Bowdoin College, graduating Phi Beta Kappa in 1845. He continued his studies at Harvard Divinity School, graduating in 1848.  In 1890, he received the honorary degree of Doctor of Divinity from Bowdoin College. He became a Mason and was the chaplain of his local chapter. Hr described himself as a "Garrisonian abolitionist".

In 1849 he married Mary Elizabeth (1825–1912) the eldest daughter of Sylvanus Plympton, M.D., of Cambridge, Massachusetts. Their children were: Mary Elizabeth Young Stevens (1849–1891), Lucy F. Young (1854–1922), Dr. Joshua Edson Young of Medford, Massachusetts (1856–1940), Henry Guy Young of Winchester, Massachusetts (1865–1936), and Mrs. Grace D. Pattton of Bangor, Maine.

He held the following positions as minister:

 1849–1852 New North Church, Boston.
 1852–1862 First Congregational (Unitarian) Church, Burlington, Vermont. His salary was $1,000, . He was at first very popular, but began to lose popularity when parishioners learned that he had been on the Boston Vigilance Committee and sheltered fugitive slaves in his home. He was also accused by the church of doing the same in Burlington; the charge was not substantiated. In 1858, when he resigned his pulpit at the Burlington church, the church held a meeting to persuade him to withdraw his resignation, which he did. He was also Superintendent of Common Schools in Burlington. He resigned these positions in 1862. There followed a year in Deerfield [Massachusetts].
 1864–1868 3rd Congregational Society, Hingham, Massachusetts. One source says his salary was $1,200, another $1,500. Between this position and the following one in Fall River he travelled to Egypt, the Holy Land, and Europe.
 1868–1875 Unitarian Church, Fall River, Massachusetts.
 1875–1904 First Parish Meeting House, Groton, Massachusetts.

Young died in 1904 in Winchester, Massachusetts, at the home of his son. He was buried in Mount Auburn Cemetery. That cemetery was where abolitionists like Wendell Phillips wanted Brown to be buried. (See John Brown's body.) On his tombstone are the same words from  that he said over John Brown's coffin as it was lowered into the ground: "I have fought the good fight, I have finished my course."

Young and slavery
Young described himself as "bred in the Garrisonian school of abolitionists". His graduate school and his first call to the pulpit were in Boston, center of the American abolitionist movement and where Wm. Lloyd Garrison's newspaper The Liberator was published. Young was a member of the Boston Vigilance Committee, set up after passage of the Fugitive Slave Law of 1850 to help  fugitives avoid slave catchers. He saw the forced and public return of fugitive Anthony Burns to slavery, and gave a sermon on it, published as a pamphlet.

Young was also "a station-keeper on the Underground Railroad when the blow at Harper's Ferry shook the whole nation like an earthquake". He frequently sheltered fugitives himself. One account says that he sheltered up to six fugitives at a time in his "comfortable" barn. Another source says that about 1850 fugitives appeared daily, and sometimes more than one a day, but then dropped to two or three a fortnight.

The John Brown funeral
The  most significant event of Young's life, in his own judgment, was his participation in the funeral of abolitionist John Brown, the consequences of which participation surprised and pained him. He often spoke about it and, as an old man, he wrote up his experience at length.

Brown was executed by the Commonwealth of Virginia on December 2, 1859, after his conviction for murder, treason, and inciting a slave insurrection. They traveled all night and arrived only hours before the service began. As he was the only minister present (others had declined), when Wendell Phillips asked him to preside, he said that he then "knew why God had sent [him] there". The reporter present, who took it down "phonographically" (stenographically), called Young's impromptu opening prayer "impressive".
As the body was being lowered into the grave he felt moved to recite words of the apostle Paul: "I have fought a good fight. I have finished my course. I have kept the faith".

When he returned to Burlington, he found himself savagely attacked in the local paper. He was socially ostracized and snubbed and prominent members of his church resigned. Young said he was the victim of persecution.

He was told that he would never again be permitted to occupy a pulpit.

In a 2016 sermon on Young, Rev. Karen G. Johnston says, without explanation, "that there is dispute between Young’s account, and that of the Burlington church, about what led to his leaving."

Reburials in 1899

Young presided over the 1899 ceremony in which 10 of Brown's men, which had been buried elsewhere, 8 of them thrown into 2 packing crates, were reburied next to John Brown's grave.

Publications

Legacy
 Folk singer Pete Sutherland based a 1997 song, "A Crown of Righteousness”, on a sermon by Young.
 In 2012, lines from Young's 1854 sermon “Come and See What It Is to Be a Unitarian" were used for responsive reading by Young's final parish, the First Parish Church of Groton.

References

This article incorporates material from a work in the public domain: Proceedings of the Grand Lodge of Massachusetts, 1872, pp. 385–387.

People from Burlington, Vermont
1823 births
1904 deaths
American Unitarian clergy
American Congregationalist ministers
Bowdoin College alumni
People from Pittston, Maine
Harvard Divinity School alumni
Doctors of Divinity
People from Fall River, Massachusetts
American Freemasons
People from Groton, Massachusetts
Young
People from Hingham, Massachusetts
People from Boston
Underground Railroad people
Burials at Mount Auburn Cemetery